The 2019 Shillong Premier League was 10th season of Shillong Premier League, the top-tier football league in Shillong, a city in Indian state of Meghalaya. Langsning F.C. was defending champions. The league commenced from 20 August 2019. It was also known as Officers Choices Blue Shillong Premier League due to sponsorship reasons.

Format
The 10th season of Shillong Premier League has been restructured. League will be played in regular format only, which means there will be no playoffs or final like previous seasons. Team finishing at the top of points table will be crowned champions. Bottom two teams will be relegated to First Division.

Teams
 Laban SC 
 Langsning
 Nangkiew Irat SC 
 Nongrim Hills SC 
 Rangdajied United
 Ryntih SC
 Shillong Lajong

Standing

Matches

References

Shillong Premier League
2019–20 in Indian football leagues